Nagkesar oil is extracted from seeds of the nagkesar tree (Mesua ferrea, Hindi: नागकेसर). It belongs to the Calophyllaceae family. It is an East Indian evergreen tree and is often planted as an ornamental for its fragrant white flowers that yield a perfume. It is the source of hardwood used for railroad ties. It is  Sri Lanka's national tree.

Etymology 
The generic name is after J. Mesue (777–857) and the specific epithet is from Latin, meaning 'belonging to iron', in reference to its famed and very hard, durable timber.

Common names
It is commonly known as Ceylon ironwood, cobra's saffron, Indian rose chestnut, ironwood tree, mesua, poached egg tree

Common names in India
Hindi− नाग चम्पा (Nag champa, नागकेसर( Nagkesar )
Urdu− नर्मिश्क, Narmishka
Tamil− Tadinangu, நாகப்பூ( nagappu), நாகேசுரம் (nakecuram)
Marathi− Thorlachampa, नागचंपा (nagchampa), नागकेशर (nagakeshara)
Malayalam− (Vainavu, ചുരുളി (churuli
Assam− নোক্তে (Nokte ), নাহৰ (Nahor), নাগেশ্বৰ (Nageshwar)
Meitei− নাগেসৰ (Nageshor )
Telugu−నాగకేసరము (nagakesaramu)
Sanskrit नागकेशर (nagakesarah), नागपुष्प( nagapuspah)
Kannada− ನಾಗ ಕೇಸರಿ( nagakesari), ನಾಗ ಸಮ್ಪಿಗೆ (nagasampige)
Bengali− নাগকেশর (nagkesar, পুন্নাগ (punnaga)
Gujarati− નાગચંપા( nagachampa)
Kashmiri− नागकेसर (nagkesarah)

Common name in other countries
English− Ceylon ironwood, Cobra's saffron, Indian rose-chestnut, Iron-wood tree, Sembawang tree (Singapore)
Italian− Croco di cobra
German− Nagassamen
Arabic− Narae-kaisar
Russian− Indiiskoe zheleznoe derevo, Mezua zheleznaia, Mezuia zheleznaia, Nagakeshara (from Hindi), Zheleznoe derevo.
Burmese− Gungen, Kenga
Chinese- : Tie li mu, (Taiwan)
Japanese− Tagayasan
Thai- : Bhra na kaw, Bunnak (Boon naak), Ka ko (Karen), Gaa gaaw, Gam gaaw, Kam ko (Shan), Saan phee daawy, Saraphi doi (Chiang Mai)

Habitat
M. ferrea reaches up to  height.The tree is native to Sri Lanka, India, southern Nepal, Burma, Thailand, Indochina, the Philippines, Malaysia and Sumatra, where it grows in evergreen forests, especially in river valleys. It is the only ironwood forest in the dry zone with wet zone vegetation.

Morphology

Tree
The emerging young leaves are red to yellowish pink and droop. Its density is 1.12 ton/m3.

Flowers
Its flowers are terminal or axillary, bisexual, solitary or in an up to nine-flowered open panicle, pedicel with small paired bracts. It has four decussate sepals  sub-orbicular, persistent and variously enlarged and thickened in fruit. Stamens are numerous, free or connate only at the base, ovary superior (1-2 celled) each cell with one to two axillary ovules. They are slender with a peltate to four-lobed stigma. The flowers are  diameter, with four white petals. The flowers are used to make an incense and to stuff pillows.

Fruits
The fruit is a capsule, usually globule, often beaked, thinly woody, usually dehiscing with two to four valves before falling, often exuding resinous droplets. One fruit contains one to four seeds. Fruits are reddish, conical hard and ovoid. The fruit diameter is 3.0" and nearly woody. The seeds are dark brown fleshy oily cotyledons. Fruits weigh from  each.

Seeds
The fruit contains one round or three conical brown, shiny, seeds consisting of the kernel (cotyledons, 36.6%) within a fibrous outer cover (50% seed) and brittle shell (13.4%). M. ferrea seeds contained lipids (66.91-70.23 g %), moisture (4.02-5.05 g %), ash (1.46-1.50 g %), total protein (6.99-7.19 g %), water-soluble protein (2.98-3.11 g %), starch (5.51-5.85 g %), crude fiber (1.22-1.98 g %), carbohydrate (15.88-18.68 g %). The energy value is 700.55-724.15 kcal/100 g.

Physical properties and composition
The major fatty acids in nagkesar oil are oleic acid, linoleic acid, stearic acid, and palmitic acid. Polyphenols and volatiles can contribute an unpleasant odour. These include the 4-phenyl coumarins mesuol, mammeisin, mesuagin and mammeigin.

See also
Mesua ferrea
Nagkesar
Trees of India

References

Vegetable oils